365 (three hundred [and] sixty-five) is the natural number following 364 and preceding 366.

Mathematics

365 is a semiprime centered square number. It is also the fifth 38-gonal number.

Both 5 and 73 are prime numbers.

It is the smallest number that has more than one expression as a sum of consecutive square numbers:

There are no known primes with period 365, while at least one prime with each of the periods 1 to 364 is known.

Timekeeping
There are 365.2422 solar days in the mean tropical year. Several solar calendars have a year containing 365 days. Related to this, in Ontario, the driver's license learner's permit used to be called "365" because it was valid for only 366 days. Financial and scientific calculations often use a 365-day calendar to simplify daily rates.

Religious meanings

Judeo-Christian
In the Jewish faith there are 365 "negative commandments". Also, the Bible states that Enoch lived for 365 years before entering heaven alive (see ).

Gnosticism
The letters of the deity Abraxas, in the Greek notation, make up the number 365. This number was subsequently viewed as signifying the levels of heaven.

References

Integers